Rizal's 1st congressional district is one of the four congressional districts of the Philippines in the province of Rizal. It has been represented in the House of Representatives of the Philippines since 1916 and earlier in the Philippine Assembly from 1907 to 1916. The district consists of the western Rizal municipalities of Angono, Binangonan, Cainta and Taytay. It is presently the largest legislative district in the country in terms of population. It is currently represented in the 19th Congress by Michael John R. Duavit of the Nationalist People's Coalition (NPC).

Representation history

Election results

2022

2019

2016

2013

2010

See also
Legislative districts of Rizal

References

Congressional districts of the Philippines
Politics of Rizal
History of Metro Manila
1907 establishments in the Philippines
Congressional districts of Calabarzon
Constituencies established in 1907